Aniołki (lit. Little Angels) is one of the quarters of Gdańsk in Poland.

Location 
Aniołki is located in the centre of the city, mainly around Victory Alley. It borders Wrzeszcz Górny and Wrzeszcz Dolny in the north, Młyniska in the east, Śródmieście and Siedlce in the south, and Suchanino in the west.

History 
The name of Aniołki comes from the Church of St. Michael and All the Heaven's Angels, where an old tank currently stands as a statue. The church's ruins were uncovered in 2021.

Near the quarter of Brama Oliwska, a railway station (built in 1870) functioned that was the main connection to most of Pomerania. Around 1900, the Gdańsk Główny railway station was built and the station was destroyed.

In 1896, the ruins of a cemetery were removed and replaced with Steffens Park, named after Otto Steffens.

In 1946, the ruins of the Church of St. Michael and All the Heaven's Angels were replaced with a T-34 tank.

References

External links
 Map of Aniołki

Districts of Gdańsk